Kase Lukman Lawal (born June 30, 1954) is a Nigerian-born businessman who lives and works in the United States.

Lawal was born June 30, 1954 in Ibadan. He obtained his Bachelor of Science in chemistry from Texas Southern University in 1976, and his MBA from Prairie View A&M University, both in Texas in 1978. He is the chairman and chief executive officer of CAMAC International Corporation, chairman and chief executive officer of Erin Energy Corporation, and chairman of Allied Energy Corporation in Houston, Texas, Chairman/Chief Executive Officer, CAMAC HOLDINGS; vice chairman, Port of Houston Authority Commission.   He also serves as a member of the board of directors and is a significant shareholder in Unity National Bank, the only federally insured and licensed African-American-owned bank in Texas. Lawal was a member of the National Republican Congressional Committee's Business Advisory Council and, in 1994, he was a finalist for the United States Business Entrepreneur of the Year.  Lawal is a member of Phi Beta Sigma fraternity. He was awarded an honorary doctorate degree in philosophy from Fort Valley State University

Career summary
Shell Oil Refining Company, 1975–1977, process engineer
Dresser Industries, 1977–1979, research chemist
Suncrest Investment Corporation, 1980–1982, vice president
Baker Investments, 1982–1986, president
CAMAC Holdings, 1986–, chief executive officer and president
Port of Houston Authority Board of Commissioners, 1999–2000, commissioner 2000–, vice chairman
Allied Energy Corporation, 1991–, chairman.

Awards
USAfrica Business Person of the Year, USAfrica The Newspaper, 1997.

References

External links

Yoruba businesspeople
1954 births
Living people
Texas Southern University alumni
American people of Yoruba descent
Businesspeople from Ibadan
Nigerian billionaires